Momentum Movement (shortly Momentum) is a centrist Hungarian political party founded in March 2017. It came to national prominence as a political association in January 2017 after organizing a petition about the Budapest bid for the 2024 Summer Olympics, calling for a public referendum on the matter. The petition, which gathered over 266,151 signatures, was successful, but the government cancelled the Olympic bid before a referendum could have been held. After its establishment as a political party, Momentum quickly built a national following, and presently has approximately 4,000 members.
Momentum party candidates appeared on the ballot in most electoral districts in the 2018 Hungarian parliamentary election, promoting the replacement of the government of Viktor Orbán and advocating a new generation of political change in the country. The party obtained 3.06% of the votes, failed to reach the 5% threshold and did not get any seats in the National Assembly, but is now widely considered the strongest extra-parliamentary party in Hungary, and is often involved in the organization of political events and demonstrations.

In the 2019 European Parliament election in Hungary, the party obtained 9.86% and became the third largest party in the election. Two candidates of the party – Katalin Cseh and Anna Donáth – were elected to the European Parliament.

Political positions 
Momentum advocates for the replacement of the present Hungarian political elite, including the government of Viktor Orbán, with a "new breed of political community in Hungary." The party is generally pro-European, pro-globalization, and anti-Putin, claiming that Hungary does not need to sacrifice its own interests in order to fulfil its commitments to the European Union. The party's social views are largely progressive in nature; it supports gay marriage, the decriminalisation of cannabis, and abortion rights. Momentum nonetheless calls itself a centrist party, and rejects classification on either side of the political spectrum. It calls for bipartisan co-operation, writing in its mission statement that Hungary "must not be divided by ideological battles, but brought together by common goals."

History 
In early 2015, the Momentum Movement group was created by ten Hungarians. On November 3, 2016, the group registered as an association, led by lawyer Dániel Károly Csala. By February 2017, the association lead a drive for a referendum on Budapest's bid for the 2024 Summer Olympics: they had 143 members and 1,800 activists. On March 4, 2017, Momentum Movement became an official political party, with 99 founding members. András Fekete-Győr was elected as party leader, while Anna Orosz, Tamás Soproni, Edina Pottyondy and Barnabás Kádár became deputy presidents.

In May 2017, pollsters estimated that the party stood at 3% national support. Most of its supporters were high school graduates under the age of 40 or college-educated urban residents. In October 2017, the party released its platform for the upcoming election, a 363-page document proposing solutions to an array of perceived issues in the Hungarian governmental system. The critical reception to the document was mixed: one major Hungarian news outlet, the Magyar Idők, called the document a "pile of empty promises," while another, hvg.hu, wrote that the document's proposed healthcare policy seemed "the most detailed and thorough." In March 2018, the party announced that their parliamentary candidates would be on the ballot in 97 out of 106 electoral districts in Hungary. On April 8, 2018, the party obtained 3.08% of the popular vote in the parliamentary elections. Momentum did not meet the threshold for the party to be recognized in parliament, but qualified for government subsidies for the next term.

On May 5, 2018, the president of the party resigned, and the three head directors of the party temporarily took over leadership. In April 2019, the party was registered for the 2019 European Parliament election. On May 26, 2019, the party obtained 9.86% of the popular vote (becoming the third largest party in the election), thus meeting the 5% threshold: two candidates of the party were elected to the European Parliament.

In 2019 local election the party managed to win mayorships of three Budapest districts and 29 seats in counties' assemblies (mostly in Pest county).

Organizational structure

Organizational hubs 
Momentum has 95 organizational hubs across Hungary, as well as ten international hubs in Germany, Austria, the Netherlands, the UK, Belgium, France, Denmark and Sweden.

Organizational structure 
Operation of Momentum is overseen by a chair of five members, including the president of the party (see below), while the Congress of Delegates serves as the party's primary decision-making group.

Chair members 

 President: András Fekete-Győr, a lawyer and one of the founders of Momentum
 Vice President: Anna Júlia Donáth, a sociologist who previously worked with NGOs on problems of immigration and gay rights
 Executive Board Members
Dániel Berg, previously the international attorney of Momentum
 Miklós Hajnal, the leader of Momentum's anti-Olympic bid campaign

Election results

National Assembly

European Parliament

History of leaders

References

Political parties in Hungary
 
Political parties established in 2017
2017 establishments in Hungary
Liberal parties in Hungary
Pro-European political parties in Hungary